Júnior Paulista (literally Jr. of São Paulo state) may refer to:

 José Cristiano de Souza Júnior (born 1977), Brazilian footballer
 Fladimir Rufino Piazzi Júnior (born 1978), Brazilian footballer
 Luiz António Gaino Júnior (born 1981), Brazilian footballer

See also
 Juninho Paulista (born 1973), Brazilian footballer